Cole Ford (born December 31, 1972) is a retired American football placekicker in the National Football League.  He is the son of AlphaGraphics founder Rodger Ford.

High school career
Ford attended Sabino High School in Tucson, where he played for the Sabercats football team.

College career
Ford played college football at the University of Southern California.

Professional career
He was drafted in the seventh round (247th pick overall) of the 1995 NFL Draft by the Pittsburgh Steelers.
Ford played between 1995 and 1997 for the National Football League's Oakland Raiders. Those first 2 seasons were successful, but his performance declined in 1997 and he was cut after that season. He played one game with the Buffalo Bills the following year before disappearing from professional football.

Legal troubles
He moved to Las Vegas in 2004 to pursue a lawsuit against the Mirage casino, demanding $5 million in damages for what he perceived as exploitation of athletes from profiting off sports betting. The lawsuit was dismissed.

On September 21, 2004 police said that he fired a gun toward the house of entertainers Siegfried & Roy. Ford was arrested and charged with three counts of felony firearms charges. At a January 2005 hearing, judge Jackie Glass ruled that Ford was incompetent to stand trial and ordered him sent to a state mental health facility to be evaluated. Ford argued that he was competent and wanted to plead guilty.

According to a psychiatrist's evaluation after the shooting, Ford stated that he did not intend to harm the performers, but wanted to "warn the world of the illusionists' unhealthy danger to them and to animals".

References

1972 births
Living people
American football placekickers
Oakland Raiders players
Players of American football from Tucson, Arizona
USC Trojans football players
Buffalo Bills players